Patricia Picot (born 20 May 1969) is a French retired wheelchair fencer who competed at international fencing competitions. She is a four-time Paralympic champion, four-time World champion and five-time European medalist.

References

1969 births
Living people
Sportspeople from Vannes
Paralympic wheelchair fencers of France
Wheelchair fencers at the 1992 Summer Paralympics
Wheelchair fencers at the 1996 Summer Paralympics
Wheelchair fencers at the 2000 Summer Paralympics
Wheelchair fencers at the 2004 Summer Paralympics
Wheelchair fencers at the 2008 Summer Paralympics
Medalists at the 1992 Summer Paralympics
Medalists at the 1996 Summer Paralympics
Medalists at the 2000 Summer Paralympics
Medalists at the 2004 Summer Paralympics